David Charles Johnson (born October 4, 1948) is a former professional baseball pitcher. He played all or part of four seasons in Major League Baseball between 1974 and 1978 for the Baltimore Orioles and Minnesota Twins.

External links
, or Retrosheet, or Pelota Binaria (Venezuelan Winter League)

1948 births
Living people
Aberdeen Pheasants players
Asheville Orioles players
Baltimore Orioles players
Baseball players from Texas
Bluefield Orioles players
Cardenales de Lara players
American expatriate baseball players in Venezuela
Major League Baseball pitchers
Minnesota Twins players
Rochester Red Wings players
San Jose Missions players
Sportspeople from Abilene, Texas
Stockton Ports players
Tiburones de La Guaira players
Toledo Mud Hens players